The 2013 UEMOA Tournament was the sixth edition of the UEMOA Tournament. It was held in Abidjan, Côte d'Ivoire, from  27 October to 2 November 2013. The competition is used as a way of developing players in the West African region.

Participants

Group stage
The draw for the group stage was conducted in Novotel Hotel in Abidjan on 30 August 2013.

Group A

Group B

Final

References 

2013 in African football
2013
International association football competitions hosted by Ivory Coast
2013–14 in Ivorian football